Andrea Risolo (born 13 August 1996) is an Italian professional footballer who plays as a midfielder for  club Virtus Francavilla.

Career
Born in Mesagne, Risolo started his career in Lecce youth sector. On Lecce, he was loaned to Akragas and Virtus Francavilla, both in Serie D.

For the 2016–17 season, he moved to Serie D club Bisceglie, winning the promotion on his first year. He left the club in August 2018, after played two Serie C seasons.

On 13 July 2019, he signed with Serie C club Catanzaro.
On 9 January 2020, he returned to Virtus Francavilla on loan.

On 15 January 2022, he joined to Fidelis Andria.

On 19 July 2022, Risolo returned to Virtus Francavilla once again.

References

External links
 
 

1996 births
Living people
People from Mesagne
Footballers from Apulia
Italian footballers
Association football midfielders
Serie C players
Serie D players
U.S. Lecce players
S.S. Akragas Città dei Templi players
Virtus Francavilla Calcio players
A.S. Bisceglie Calcio 1913 players
U.S. Catanzaro 1929 players
S.S. Fidelis Andria 1928 players
Sportspeople from the Province of Brindisi